A Simple Life, also known as Sister Peach, is a 2011 Hong Kong drama film directed by Ann Hui and starring Andy Lau and Deanie Ip. Ip, in the lead role of Sister Peach, won the Best Actress Award at the 68th Venice International Film Festival. Originally, Hui considered retiring after making this film. However, due to the film's success, she changed her mind and is considering other projects.

Lau and Ip had not worked together since 1999's Prince Charming. Production of the film officially began during Chinese New Year. It was filmed in Mei Foo Sun Chuen. Production was wrapped on 6 April 2011 after two months of filming. The film competed in the 68th Venice International Film Festival. It was also selected as the Hong Kong entry for the Best Foreign Language Film at the 84th Academy Awards, but it did not make the final shortlist.
A Simple Life was an official selection for competition at the 68th Venice International Film Festival, where it won 4 awards. Deanie Ip won the Volpi Cup for Best Actress for her role in this film. She is the first Hong Konger to win this prize. In March, she also became the first Hong Konger to win the Asian Film Award for Best Actress. At the same event, director Ann Hui became the first woman to win the Lifetime Achievement Award. At the 31st Hong Kong Film Awards Ceremony, A Simple Life won 5 major prizes (film, director, screenplay, actor, actress), repeating what happened with Hui's Summer Snow in 1996. Ann Hui has won Best Director (4 times) more than anyone else at the Hong Kong Film Awards. Ip is the oldest Best Actress recipient (64 years old at the time of her win).

Plot
Roger Leung (Andy Lau), an unmarried middle aged Hong Kong film producer, lives with Chung Chun-to (Deanie Ip), a maidservant who has worked for his family for decades. Returning home after a business trip, Roger discovers Chung on the floor and calls for an ambulance. At the hospital, Roger discovers that Chung has had a stroke but rather than ask for rehabilitation, Chung decides she wants to retire and asks to be put in a nursing home. While looking for a nursing home, Roger discovers one nearby that is owned by his friend. He installs Chung there and visits her in between his production jobs. While visiting To, he tells her friends and neighbours that he is her god son in order to explain their connection.

Visiting Chung in the nursing home allows Roger to become closer to her. Eventually, other members of his family, who mostly live abroad, come to visit her. Roger's mother proposes that they renovate an old apartment that the family owns and allow To to spend the remainder of her days there. However, Chung grows more sickly and suffers a second stroke causing her condition to deteriorate and nullifying the family's plans for her.

Eventually, Chung is hospitalized a final time and Roger makes the decision to allow her to die. At her funeral, the members of Roger's family pay their respects to her and while Roger delivers the eulogy, a man from the nursing home comes to give her flowers.

Production
Producer Roger Lee began writing loose fragments together and showed them to director Ann Hui. She persuaded him it was enough for a screenplay and encouraged him through his writing process.

Andy Lau and Deanie Ip were chosen in part because of their close relationship to one another as Ip is Lau's godmother and had already played his mother in several films.

Cast
 Andy Lau as Roger Leung (梁羅傑), a film producer
 Deanie Ip as Sister Peach / Chung Chun-to (桃姐/鍾春桃), a servant
 Wang Fuli as Roger's mother
 Qin Hailu as Ms Choi (蔡姑娘), nursing home manager
 Paul Chun as Uncle Kin (堅叔) a resident at the nursing home
 Leung Tin as Headmaster (校長, a resident at the nursing home
 Yu Man-si as Sharon, Roger's older sister
 Eman Lam as Carmen. Roger's administrative assistant
 Hui Pik-kei as Aunt Kam(金姨), a resident at the nursing home
 Elena Kong as Aunt Kam's daughter
 Jason Chan as Jason, Roger's nephew
 Ho So-ying as Aunt Mui (梅姑), a resident at the nursing home

Cameos
 Anthony Wong as Grasshopper (草蜢), care home owner and Roger's old friend
 Chapman To as a dentist
 Raymond Chow as himself, one of the guests at film premier
 Yu Dong as himself
 Sammo Hung as himself
 Tsui Hark as himself
 Francis Mak as one of Roger's old classmates
 Lawrence Lau as one of Roger's old classmates
 Dennis Chan as Vincent
 Ning Hao as himself, one of the guests at film premier
 Lam Yee-nok as himself, the pastor at To's funeral
 Gordon Lam as himself, one of the guests at film premier
 Law Lan as herself, one of the guests at film premier
 Jim Chim as one of Roger's old classmates
 Tam Ping-man as himself, a visitor of the nursing home
 Eva Lai as himself, a visitor of the nursing home
 Kung Suet-fa as the nursing home receptionist
 Queenie Chu as the receptionist at investment bank
 Tyson Chak as Air-con fixer at investment bank
 Hiromi Wada as visiting singer of the nursing home
 Angelababy as herself, one of the guests at film premier
 John Shum as himself, one of the guests at film premier
 Stanley Kwan as himself, one of the guests at film premier
 Andrew Lau as himself, one of the guests at film premier

Box office
In China, after being shown for only four days, the film made US$5.2 million and reached second place in the top gross film of the week ending 11 March 2012.

Critical reception
Roger Ebert gave the film 4 stars. He wrote, "It expresses hope in human nature. It is one of the year's best films." Hollywood Reporters Neil Young wrote that "Film festivals looking for undemanding crowd-pleasers will want to check it out, even at its currently excessive 118-minute running time – much too long for what is indeed a pretty "simple" affair." Varietys Justin Chang commented: "Fittingly for a film about the challenges and rewards of looking after the sick and aging, this well-observed, pleasantly meandering dramedy requires a measure of patience, and some judicious trimming would improve its chances for export. But the moving, never tearjerking lead performances by Andy Lau and Deanie Ip are strong selling points for Hui's following at home and abroad."

Top ten lists
The film has appeared on the following critics' top ten lists for the best films of 2012:

Awards and nominations

My 30 Work Days
The book, My 30 Work Days, was written by Andy Lau extracted from diaries and notes that he wrote while shooting the A Simple Life. The book contains Lau's 30 personal diaries and notes detailing his observations and thoughts about issues raised by the story of the film, in particular appreciation of and care for the elderly, along with 300 behind the scene photographs taken by Lau and his colleagues. The book was published on 27 February 2017 by Ming Pao Publications in Hong Kong.

See also
 Andy Lau filmography
 List of submissions to the 84th Academy Awards for Best Foreign Language Film
 List of Hong Kong submissions for the Academy Award for Best Foreign Language Film

References

External links
 
 
 

2011 films
Hong Kong drama films
2011 drama films
2010s Cantonese-language films
Films directed by Ann Hui
Best Film HKFA
Drama films based on actual events
Films about old age
Films about film directors and producers
Films set in Hong Kong
Films shot in Hong Kong
Films whose director won the Best Director Golden Horse Award
Polybona Films films
Films with screenplays by Susan Chan
Hong Kong New Wave films
2010s Hong Kong films